Typhoon Xangsane, known in the Philippines as Typhoon Milenyo, was a typhoon that affected the Philippines, Vietnam, and Thailand during the 2006 Pacific typhoon season. The name Xangsane was submitted by Laos and means elephant.

Xangsane made landfall in the Philippines, battering the northern islands with torrential rains and strong winds, and causing widespread flooding and landslides. After passing over Manila and emerging over the South China Sea, the typhoon made a second landfall in central Vietnam, also causing flooding and landslides there and in Thailand. The storm was responsible for at least 312 deaths, mostly in the Philippines and Vietnam, and at least US$747 million in damage.

Meteorological history

The nucleus of Typhoon Xangsane originated from a disturbance embedded within the monsoon trough to the east of the Philippines. The Japan Meteorological Agency (JMA) declared the formation of a tropical depression at 00:00 UTC on September 25. Simultaneously, the Philippine Atmospheric, Geophysical and Astronomical Services Administration (PAGASA) began releasing warnings in relation to the tropical depression with the local name Milenyo. The Joint Typhoon Warning Center (JTWC; a joint United States Navy – Air Force agency that monitors tropical cyclones globally) issued a Tropical Cyclone Formation Alert around the same time, designating the disturbance Tropical Depression 18W at 12:00 UTC. The system quickly organized as it drifted westward, and according to both the JMA and the JTWC, it attained tropical storm intensity near 00:00 UTC on September 26. Consequently, it received the international name Xangsane. The name was submitted by Laos and means "elephant".

The storm began to accelerate in forward speed and shift its direction toward the west-northwest, attaining typhoon intensity at 18:00 UTC on September 26. The center of the powerful storm skirted the northern coast of Samar and continued west-northwestward. With a well-defined eye evident on visible satellite imagery, Xangsane struck southern Luzon around 12:00 UTC, and remained over the Philippines for the next day or so. Due to extensive interaction with land, the typhoon's structure deteriorated, and the JMA downgraded it to a severe tropical storm early on September 28. Xangsane traveled over the Manila area early on September 28 before entering the South China Sea and turning due west, steered by the subtropical ridge to its north over mainland China.

Over open waters, the system encountered conditions favorable to renewed intensification, including warm sea surface temperatures, light vertical wind shear, and strong upper-level divergence. As a result, it reattained typhoon status by 18:00 UTC on September 28. Just after 00:00 UTC on October 1, the system made landfall along the central coast of Vietnam, near Da Nang. The storm quickly declined in force as it progressed inland through Indochina: it weakened to a severe tropical storm around 12:00 UTC, and to a tropical storm six hours later. Although the JTWC issued its final warning on Xangsane just after landfall, the agency continued to track the storm until 00:00 on October 2. At the same time, the JMA downgraded Xangsane to a tropical depression; it dissipated later that day, over Thailand.

Preparations

Philippines

On September 27, PAGASA issued Storm Signal Number 3, a warning for winds of 100185 km/h (62115 mph), for areas of southern Luzon. Storm Signal Number 2, for winds of 60100 km/h (3762 mph), was raised for northern Samar Island and central Luzon. Storm Signal Number 1 (3060 km/h, 2037 mph) was issued for northwestern Luzon, including Metro Manila, and northern Visayas, including the rest of Samar Island. Schools in the warned area were suspended, and airports and seaports were closed. Philippine Airlines cancelled over half of its flights to and from Ninoy Aquino International Airport for September 28, and various transit services also suspended service. Metro Manila and the Tagalog provinces were warned of possible flooding and strong winds.

When it became clear that Xangsane would approach the Capital, PAGASA upgraded the warning for Manila and central Luzon to Storm Signal Number 3 on September 28. All the storm signals were discontinued later that day.

Vietnam
Prior to Xangsane's final landfall, the Vietnamese government set up a steering committee headed by Deputy Prime Minister Nguyễn Sinh Hùng to oversee evacuations and storm preparations throughout central Vietnam. Provincial and local authorities evacuated over 300,000 people from low-lying areas along the coast from Hà Tĩnh to Phú Yên, as well as hilly areas prone to landslides. The Vietnamese government also ordered about 2,400 boats, including 273 fishing boats, to return to port. Vietnam Airlines, the national airline, cancelled or diverted all flights on September 30 and October 1. These efforts were carried out in order to prevent a repeat of the damage and fatalities caused by Typhoon Chanchu earlier in the season.

Thailand
Although Xangsane had weakened considerably over land, residents of northern Thailand were advised of the threat of flooding from the remnant low of Xangsane as it approached. The Department of Disaster Prevention and Mitigation alerted its provincial offices throughout the country to be prepared for strong winds, flash flooding, and landslides. Residents in highland areas were also warned of possible mudslides, and the army was dispatched to aid in regional storm preparations.

Impact

Philippines
Damage was widespread in the Philippines, particularly in Metro Manila, where the typhoon passed almost directly over. Power and water was lost in several provinces, while overflowing rivers caused flooding, landslides and made roads impassable. In some parts of the country, electricity was cut off for up to six days straight. Many trees and billboards were toppled by Xangsane, while Luzon suffered an island-wide power outage. Rough waters and seaport closures left at least 3,400 people and nearly 270 vehicles stranded in ports and terminals, mainly at the primary ferry crossing between Samar Island and Bicol Region. Local and provincial officials described Xangsane as the worst typhoon to directly impact Manila since Typhoon Angela passed over the city eleven years ago.

The Philippine government estimated that approximately 2 million people in 19 provinces were affected by Xangsane, which destroyed many homes and farms on its path through the islands. The local and regional Philippine National Red Cross chapters reported major damage in at least 116 municipalities, 12 cities, and a total of 1,295 barangays across the country. Torrential rains from Milenyo also caused flooding and landslides in Laguna, Cavite, and Quezon. Xangsane caused the destruction of the Calumpang Dam in the Municipality of Liliw, which channeled water to irrigation canals around the area. In all, Milenyo was responsible for 197 deaths and 5.9 billion Philippine pesos ($118 million, 2006 USD) in damage, mostly to personal property and agriculture.

Vietnam

Xangsane made its second and final landfall in central Vietnam, causing severe flooding and strong winds that caused nearly 10 trillion Vietnamese đồng ($629 million, 2006 USD) in damage and killed 71 people. The worst structural damage occurred in the city of Da Nang, where 26 people were killed. The provinces of Quảng Nam and Nghệ An were also hard hit, with a total of 25 people killed. The storm damaged or destroyed around 320,000 homes, downed thousands of trees and power lines, and flooded major streets.

Significant agricultural damage was reported, especially in Quảng Bình Province.

Thailand
The remnants of Xangsane moved over Thailand on October 2 and combined with monsoonal moisture over the north central part of the country, causing torrential rains and severe flooding in over 35 provinces. The Department of Disaster Prevention and Mitigation reported 47 deaths, and villages in several provinces reported significant levels of water pollution and waterborne illnesses from stagnant waters.

Aftermath

Philippines

Following the passage of Xangsane, the International Federation of Red Cross and Red Crescent Societies (IFRC) issued an emergency request for 5.7 million Swiss francs ($4.6 million, 2006 USD) to aid the Philippine Red Cross in its relief effort. In addition, the movement dispatched 3,000 workers and three disaster response teams to affected areas for search and rescue missions, damage assessments, and assistance to people affected by the typhoon. The Philippine Red Cross provided canned goods, rice, clothing, and personal hygiene items to over 6,300 families, and local volunteers provided assistance to people in shelters. The Spanish Red Cross, present since 1998 as a backup to the Philippine Red Cross, also sent officials, logistics equipment, and water purification systems to the more heavily areas to aid in disaster relief and damage assessments.

In Manila, fallen billboards killed several people and caused traffic delays along EDSA, the main highway of the metropolis. This prompted some members of the Senate of the Philippines to push for the removal and banning of billboard advertising in the Manila area, which had been an issue for some time. Senator Miriam Defensor Santiago wrote an appeal to President Gloria Macapagal Arroyo, asking her to approve the "Anti-Billboard Blight Act of 2006", which would ban billboard advertising on major thoroughfares within Metro Manila.

Vietnam
On October 3, the IFRC released 100,000 Swiss francs ($80,300, 2006 USD) from its disaster relief fund to support the Red Cross of Vietnam, and issued an emergency appeal for 1 million Swiss francs ($810,000, 2006 USD) in aid the next day. The Vietnamese government also released 100 billion Vietnamese đồng ($6.2 million, 2006 USD) and 1,500 metric tons (1,650 short tons) of rice from the national food security stock to help the recovery effort in central Vietnam. The National Fatherland Front also issued an appeal to national and international organizations for donations and aid. According to Vietnam Television's report prior to the impact of Typhoon Noru in late September 2022, due to the over-strengthen the storm was that the national observation agencies decided to upgrade typhoon level from 12 to 17.

On October 13, a minivan carrying a relief team from a local government in Ho Chi Minh city was caught in an accident, killing 12 aid workers.

Thailand
The Department of Disaster Prevention and Mitigation and the Thai Red Cross Society evacuated residents from areas of central Thailand that had been affected by flooding from the remnants of Xangsane. The Red Cross also provided victims and evacuees with food and emergency kits, and several Red Cross health centers in 12 provinces issued emergency relief kits, drinking water, and medicine kits to at least 16,000 families in flood-stricken areas.

Retirement
As a result of the deaths and damage caused, it was decided at the 39th annual meeting of the ESCAP/WMO Typhoon Committee in Manila in December 2006 that the name Xangsane, along with four others, would be retired from the name list. Its PAGASA name, Milenyo, was also retired by PAGASA. In December 2007, the committee selected the name Leepi to replace Xangsane on the Western Pacific basin name lists beginning in 2008. In 2010 the name selected by PAGASA to replace Milenyo was Mario, but the name itself was retired and was replaced with "Maymay" after devastating Metro Manila and Northern Luzon.

See also

 List of notable tropical cyclones
 Timeline of the 2006 Pacific typhoon season
 Typhoons in the Philippines
 Other typhoons that impacted the Philippines in 2006:
 Typhoon Chanchu
 Typhoon Cimaron
 Typhoon Chebi
 Typhoon Durian
 Typhoon Utor
 Super Typhoon Angela (Rosing, 1995) - Strongest typhoon to strike Metro Manila in recent recorded history
 Tropical Storm Ketsana (Ondoy, 2009) - Deadliest typhoon to strike Metro Manila in recent recorded history, also had a destructive impact in Vietnam
 Typhoon Nari (Santi, 2013) - Affected the same areas, though weaker on landfalls
 Typhoon Vamco (Ulysses, 2020) - Also devastated both the Philippines and Vietnam
 Tropical Storm Conson (Jolina, 2021) - Very similar path to Xangsane
 Typhoon Noru (Karding, 2022) - very similar path and intensity

References

External links

RSMC Tokyo - Typhoon Center
Best Track Data of Typhoon Xangsane (0615) 
Best Track Data (Graphics) of Typhoon Xangsane (0615)
Best Track Data (Text)
JTWC Best Track Data  of Typhoon 18W (Xangsane)

Retired Pacific typhoons
2006 Pacific typhoon season
Typhoons in Vietnam
Typhoons in Thailand
2006 disasters in the Philippines
Typhoons in the Philippines
Typhoon Xangsane
Typhoons
Retired Philippine typhoon names
Xangsane
History of Da Nang
History of Quảng Nam province